Dhani is a village located in the Bali tehsil in the Pali district of Rajasthan. It is located near Bali town on state highway SH 62 between Khudala and Khimel in a valley on the western side of the Aravalli Range. Dhani is easily accessed by Western Railway Ahmedabad Delhi route near from Falna and Rani Station. Dhani is famous village in Marwar for Making of Mojari-Shoes. The first lady sarpanch in this village is Nalini kanwar wife of ranveer Singh bhati she was very active in all village activities she make a village very much well as compared to other village.

References
Ministry of Panchayati Raj Government of India List of Census Villages mapped for :DHANI Gram Panchayat,BALI,PALI,RAJASTHAN Sr. No. Census Village Code Census Village Name Main Village 1. 02475300 Dhani 2.02475700 Sela 3.02475900 Kagri 4.02476000 Karlai 5.02481800 Chamunderi Rana Watan Report printed on 16/11/2010 National Panchayat Portal,Panchayat Informatics Division,NIC

Area details
Area of village (in hectares) 	1,557
Number of households 	401
Population data based on 2001 census
Total population - Persons 	2,155
Total population - Males 	1,030
Total population - Females 	1,125
Scheduled castes population - Persons 	568
Scheduled castes population - Males 	285
Scheduled castes population - Females 	283
Scheduled tribes population - Persons 	19
Scheduled tribes population - Males 	8
Scheduled tribes population - Females 	11
Education facilities
Education facilities 	Available
Number of primary schools 	2
Number of middle schools 	1
Nearest town 	FALNA
Distance from the nearest town (in kilometer(s)) 	6

	

Villages in Pali district